François Parisien (born 27 April 1982) is a former professional cyclist born in Repentigny, Quebec, Canada. He competed as a professional between 2006 and 2013.

Professional career

In 2005, Parisien won the Canadian Road Race Championship.

He participated to the 2010 Tour of California and placed in the top ten on the second stage where he came in sixth position, finishing in the same group  as Australian Brett Lancaster who won the stage. He performed well the very next day on the undulating stage 3, ranking in a ninth position as he was part of a small group of about 30 riders that came in after 3 escapees crossed the line, the victor being David Zabriskie.

In 2012, he won the Tour of Elk Grove Overall classification by the slim margin of one second over John Murphy of the Kenda-5-hour Energy team. In August, he finished short of the podium in the Italian semi-classic Tre Valli Varesine, in fourth place. His fellow countryman from Quebec David Veilleux of  took a solo victory by a margin of a little more than a minute over the group Parisien was part of. In September, Parisien finished tenth of the World Tour race Grand Prix Cycliste de Québec, therefore being awarded the "Best Canadian Placing" award.

After  folded, Parisien was hired by newly World Tour promoted team  for the 2013 season. In March 2013, Parisien took the biggest victory of his career at that time as he beat Samuel Dumoulin for the bunch sprint in stage 5 of the Volta a Catalunya. An ecstatic Parisien stated that his team had concluded prior to the race that he had to be in the top 3 riders coming out of the last turn to have a chance at victory, and he followed that plan.

Parisien retired at the end of the 2013 season, after eight years as a professional. He then became an analyst for bicycle races for Réseau des sports, a Quebecer Sports Television provider.

Palmarès

2005
 1st  National Road Race Championships
2008
 5th US Air Force Cycling Classic
 8th Overall Tour de Beauce
 8th Commerce Bank Reading Classic
2009
 2nd Overall Vuelta a Cuba
1st Stage 7a (ITT)
 7th US Air Force Cycling Classic
2010
 1st Stage 2 Vuelta Mexico Telmex
 6th Overall Tour de Beauce
2012
 1st Overall Tour of Elk Grove
 4th Tre Valli Varesine
 10th Grand Prix Cycliste de Québec
2013
 1st Stage 5 Volta a Catalunya

References

External links

François Parisien's profile at Cycling Base 

1982 births
Canadian male cyclists
Cyclists from Quebec
Living people
People from Repentigny, Quebec
21st-century Canadian people